The World Is Mine or World Is Mine may refer to:
 The World Is Mine (manga), 1997
 "The World Is Mine" (Ice Cube song), 1997
 "The World Is Mine" (Cracker song), 1998
 "The World Is Mine" (Hooverphonic song), 2002
 "The World Is Mine" (David Guetta song), 2004
 "World Is Mine", a song written by ryo and performed by Hatsune Miku, from Supercell (album), 2008
 "World Is Mine", a song by ASAP Ferg featuring Big Sean, from Always Strive and Prosper, 2016